Arbury is a district and electoral ward of Cambridge, England, United Kingdom.

Arbury may also refer to:
Arbury, an electoral ward of Nuneaton and Bedworth, England, United Kingdom
Arbury, Saskatchewan, in Rural Municipality of Touchwood No. 248. Canada
Arbury Hills, Illinois, an unincorporated community, United States

See also
 Arbury Hall, manor house in Warwickshire, England, United Kingdom
 Arbury Hill, Northamptonshire, England, United Kingdom
 Arbury Park, South Australia, an historic home
 Arbury Priory, formerly on the site of Arbury Hall